Garbowo  is a settlement in the administrative district of Gmina Bytnica, within Krosno Odrzańskie County, Lubusz Voivodeship, in western Poland.

References

Garbowo